Memory timings or RAM timings describe the timing information of a memory module. Due to the inherent qualities of VLSI and microelectronics, memory chips require time to fully execute commands. Executing commands too quickly will result in data corruption and results in system instability. With appropriate time between commands, memory modules/chips can be given the opportunity to fully switch transistors, charge capacitors and correctly signal back information to the memory controller. Because system performance depends on how fast memory can be used, this timing directly affects the performance of the system.

The timing of modern synchronous dynamic random-access memory (SDRAM) is commonly indicated using four parameters: CL, TRCD, TRP, and TRAS in units of clock cycles; they are commonly written as four numbers separated with hyphens, e.g. 7-8-8-24. The fourth (tRAS) is often omitted, or a fifth, the Command rate, sometimes added (normally 2T or 1T, also written 2N, 1N). These parameters (as part of a larger whole) specify the clock latency of certain specific commands issued to a random access memory. Lower numbers imply a shorter wait between commands (as determined in clock cycles).

What determines absolute latency (and thus system performance) is determined by both the timings and the memory clock frequency. When translating memory timings into actual latency, it is important to note that timings are in units of clock cycles, which for double data rate memory is half the speed of the commonly quoted transfer rate. Without knowing the clock frequency it is impossible to state if one set of timings is "faster" than another.

For example, DDR3-2000 memory has a 1000 MHz clock frequency, which yields a 1 ns clock cycle. With this 1 ns clock, a CAS latency of 7 gives an absolute CAS latency of 7 ns. Faster DDR3-2666 memory (with a 1333 MHz clock, or 0.75 ns per cycle) may have a larger CAS latency of 9, but at a clock frequency of 1333 MHz the amount of time to wait 9 clock cycles is only 6.75 ns. It is for this reason that DDR3-2666 CL9 has a smaller absolute CAS latency than DDR3-2000 CL7  memory.

Both for DDR3 and DDR4, the four timings described earlier are not the only relevant timings and give a very short overview of the performance of memory. The full memory timings of a memory module are stored inside of a module's SPD chip. On DDR3 and DDR4 DIMM modules, this chip is a PROM or EEPROM flash memory chip and contains the JEDEC-standardized timing table data format. See the SPD article for the table layout among different versions of DDR and examples of other memory timing information that is present on these chips.

Modern DIMMs include a Serial Presence Detect (SPD) ROM chip that contains recommended memory timings for automatic configuration as well as XMP profiles of faster timing information (and higher voltages) to allow a quick and easy performance boost via overclocking. The BIOS on a PC may allow the user to manually make timing adjustments in an effort to increase performance (with possible risk of decreased stability) or, in some cases, to increase stability (by using suggested timings).

Note: Memory bandwidth measures the throughput of memory, and is generally limited by the transfer rate, not latency.  By interleaving access to SDRAM's multiple internal banks, it is possible to transfer data continuously at the peak transfer rate.  It is possible for increased bandwidth to come at a cost in latency.  In particular, each successive generation of DDR memory has higher transfer rates but the absolute latency does not change significantly, and especially when first appearing on the market, the new generation generally has longer latency than the previous one.

Increasing memory bandwidth, even while increasing memory latency, may improve the performance of a computer system with multiple processors and/or multiple execution threads. Higher bandwidth will also boost performance of integrated graphics processors that have no dedicated video memory but use regular RAM as VRAM. Modern x86 processors are heavily optimized with techniques such as instruction pipelines, out-of-order execution, memory prefetching, memory dependence prediction, and branch prediction to preemptively load memory from RAM (and other caches) to speed up execution even further. With this amount of complexity from performance optimization, it is difficult to state with certainty the effects memory timings may have on performance. Different workloads have different memory access patterns and are affected differently in performance by these memory timings.

Handling in BIOS 
In Intel systems, memory timings and management are handled by the Memory Reference Code (MRC), a part of the BIOS.

See also 
 Serial Presence Detect
 JEDEC
 Eye pattern
 Overshoot and crosstalk

References 

Computer memory

el:Μνήμη τυχαίας προσπέλασης#Χρόνος προσπέλασης